Marie-Hélène Simone Monique Amiable (born 14 March 1960) is a French politician who has served as the Mayor of Bagneux since 2004. She also served as Member of the National Assembly for the Hauts-de-Seine's 11th constituency from 2007 to 2012. Amiable is a member of the French Communist Party (PCF) and sat in the Democratic and Republican Left group in the National Assembly.

Biography

Early life and family 
Marie-Hélène Simone Monique Amiable was born on 14 March 1960 in the 11th arrondissement of Paris. She also works as a teacher and has one child.

Political career

Mayor of Bagneux 
Since 1989, Amiable has served as a municipal councillor of Bagneux, Hauts-de-Seine, as a member of the French Communist Party. She served as deputy mayor from March 1989 to March 2001 and was then elected mayor on 15 May 2004. Amiable was re-elected in 2008, 2014 and 2020.

During the 2020 French municipal elections, Amiable led an electoral list called Bagneux Pour Tous, Tous Pour Bagneux that united several left-wing parties. She won re-election with 60.74% of the vote in the first round, ahead of Patrice Martin of the Union of Democrats and Independents with 20.75%, Fatima Kadouci of La République En Marche! with 10.29% and three other lists.

Every year, Amiable and other Communist mayors in Hautes-de-Seine participate in a protest against the explosion of homeless people from shelter after the winter holidays.

Member of the National Assembly 
During the 2007 French legislative elections, Amiable was elected Member of the National Assembly for Hauts-de-Seine's 11th constituency with 58.58% of the vote, defeating Jean-Loup Metton of the Union for French Democracy and Union for a Popular Movement. Her designated substitute was Catherine Margaté, general councillor of the Canton of Malakoff since 1994 and mayor of Malakoff since 1996.

Amiable lost her seat in the 2012 legislative elections, winning 29.2% of the vote compared to Julie Sommaruga of the Socialist Party with 29.93% in the first round. As required by the agreements between left-wing parties in the election, Amiable withdrew from the race and endorsed Sommaruga in the second round.

Honours and decorations 
Marie-Hélène Amiable was named chevalier (knight) of the Ordre national du Mérite on 14 March 2013 due to her 29 years of service as a Member of the National Assembly and Mayor of Bagnueux. She also became a chevalier of the Legion of Honour on 14 April 2017 because of her 36 years of service as a departmental councillor of Hauts-de-Seine and Mayor of Bagnueux.

References

1960 births
Living people
Politicians from Paris
French Communist Party politicians
Women mayors of places in France
20th-century French women politicians
21st-century French women politicians
Women members of the National Assembly (France)
Deputies of the 13th National Assembly of the French Fifth Republic